Yasmin Menezes (born September 3, 1998) is a Brazilian female acrobatic gymnast. Along with her partner, Fabricio Carvalho de Abreu, she competed in the 2014 Acrobatic Gymnastics World Championships.

References

1998 births
Living people
Brazilian acrobatic gymnasts
Female acrobatic gymnasts